Rudolph Andrew Bukich (September 15, 1930 – February 29, 2016) was an American football player, a quarterback in the National Football League from 1953 to 1968. Known as "Rudy the Rifle" for his uncommon arm strength, he tied an NFL record with 13 consecutive pass completions in the  season. One year later, he was the second-leading passer in the league. He played college football at the University of Southern California, after transferring from the University of Iowa.

High school career
Born and raised in St. Louis, Missouri, Bukich was the son of Croatian immigrants. He was starting quarterback in his senior year at Roosevelt High School, a team that did not win a game. Bukich played one game as wingback when Roosevelt tried to upset eventual league champions Cleveland High School, St Louis by attempting to surprise them by playing the single wing.

College career
As a freshman, Bukich played at the University of Iowa before transferring to the University of Southern California in Los Angeles. During his senior year in 1952, USC played in the Rose Bowl on New Year's Day. After the Trojans' primary passer, All-American halfback Jim Sears, was sidelined early in the first quarter with a broken leg, Bukich came in and conducted a drive, completing all but two of his passes, that resulted in the only score of the game, and USC defeated Wisconsin, 7–0. Bukich was selected as the Most Valuable Player in the game, and after his career, he was inducted into the USC Trojan Hall of Fame and the Rose Bowl Hall of Fame (2004).

Professional career
Bukich was selected in the second round of the 1953 NFL Draft by the Los Angeles Rams. He later played for the Washington Redskins, Chicago Bears, and the Pittsburgh Steelers.

Bukich's greatest performances were during his second stint with the Bears in the 1960s. He was a reserve  quarterback with the Bears in 1963 when they won the NFL championship (Bill Wade was the starter throughout the season). Bukich replaced Wade during Week Four against the Baltimore Colts after Wade completed just 5 of 21 passes. Bukich played the remainder of the game and completed 6 of 7 passes, including a pass to Ronnie Bull for a touchdown that was the deciding margin of victory.

Post-playing career
After his playing days Bukich was a real estate developer in southern California. In his later years he was diagnosed with chronic traumatic encephalopathy (CTE), and he died at age 85 in San Diego in 2016. He is interred at Miramar National Cemetery in San Diego.

References

External links

Legacy.com – Rudy Bukich

1930 births
2016 deaths
USC Trojans football players
Los Angeles Rams players
Chicago Bears players
Pittsburgh Steelers players
Washington Redskins players
Players of American football from St. Louis
American people of Croatian descent
American football quarterbacks
Iowa Hawkeyes football players
Burials at Miramar National Cemetery